The Symphony No. 36 in C major, K. 425, also known as the Linz Symphony, was written by Wolfgang Amadeus Mozart during a stopover in the Austrian town of Linz on his and his wife's way back home to Vienna from Salzburg in late 1783. The entire symphony was written in four days to accommodate the local count's announcement, upon hearing of the Mozarts' arrival in Linz, of a concert. The première in Linz took place on 4 November 1783. The composition was also premièred in Vienna on 1 April 1784. The autograph score of the "Linz Symphony" was not preserved, but a set of parts sold by Mozart to the Fürstenberg court at Donaueschingen in 1786 does survive.

Structure 
The symphony is scored for 2 oboes, 2 bassoons, 2 horns, 2 trumpets, timpani and strings.

There are 4 movements:

Adagio,  – Allegro spiritoso, 
Andante in F major, 
Menuetto, 
Finale (Presto), 

Every movement except the minuet is in sonata form.

The slow movement has a siciliano character and meter which was rare in Mozart's earlier symphonies (only used in one of the slow movements of the "Paris") but would appear frequently in later works such as No. 38 and No. 40.

The next symphony by Mozart is Symphony No. 38. The work known as "Symphony No. 37" is mostly by Michael Haydn.

Notes

Further reading
Steinberg, Michael. "The Symphony: A Listeners Guide". p. 153. Oxford University Press, 1995.

External links 
 
 

36
Compositions in C major
1783 compositions